Michael Francklin or Franklin (6 December 1733 – 8 November 1782) served as Nova Scotia's Lieutenant Governor from 1766 to 1772. He is buried in the crypt of St. Paul's Church (Halifax).

Early life and immigration
Born in Poole, England, Francklin immigrated to Halifax, Nova Scotia in 1752. He worked as a trader and merchant, initially in association with Joshua Maugher.

Capture
During Father Le Loutre's War, Michael Francklin was captured by a Mi'kmaw raiding party in 1754 and held captive for three months in which he learned the Mi'kmaw language and developed an appreciation for native culture.

Political career

Francklin represented Lunenburg County from 1759 to 1760 and Halifax County from 1761 to 1762 in the Nova Scotia House of Assembly.

On February 7, 1762, Francklin married Susannah Boutineau. In May of that year, he was named to the Nova Scotia Council.

In the early 1770s, he was responsible for bringing about the Yorkshire Emigration. He also played an important role in assisting the return of Acadians after the Expulsion of the Acadians by guaranteeing Catholic worship, land grants and a promise that there would be no second expulsion.

He established the Shubenacadie reserve in 1779.

Death
He died at home in Halifax in 1782.  Many Mi'kmaq attended his funeral at St. Paul's Church (Halifax).

Legacy 
namesake of Fort Franklin, Tatamagouche, Nova Scotia (1768) 
 namesake of Mi'kmaq reserve Franklin Manor 22, Nova Scotia

See also 
Captivity Narratives - Nova Scotia

References
Endnotes

Texts
James S. Macdonald, "Lt. Governor Michael Francklin, 1752-1782"  Collections of the Nova Scotia Historical Society; (40 pp.) vol. 16 (1912) 
  W. B. Kerr, "The Rise of Michael Francklin" (7 pp.) The Dalhousie Review, Vol. 13 (1934), No. 4.

External links 
 Biography of Michael Francklin
 Memoir of Michael Franklin Collections of the Nova Scotia Historical Society

1733 births
1782 deaths
Governors of the Colony of Nova Scotia
English emigrants to pre-Confederation Nova Scotia
People from Poole
Nova Scotia pre-Confederation MLAs
Captives of Native Canadians
People of Father Le Loutre's War